A honey dipper is a kitchen utensil used to collect viscous liquid (generally honey) from a container, which it then exudes to another location. It is often made of turned wood. Besides the handle, the tool consists of equally spaced grooves. Often, the grooves descend in circumference on each new groove.

Use

One method of using the tool is to dip the grooved end into the liquid, then slowly twirl the handle between the thumb and fingers while in transport, as the concentric grooves help to minimize dripping. It is  commonly used to drizzle honey on bread, biscuits, or other foods of that nature. The tool is sometimes made of plastic or glass.

In popular culture 
The mascot of Honey Nut Cheerios, "BuzzBee", has carried various incarnations of honey dippers. Winnie-the-Pooh toys by Mattel have featured a honey dipper alongside the bear.

References

External links

 

Food preparation utensils
Honey
Wood